Michael Anthony (born 1968) is an American chef.

Background and education
Anthony grew up in Cincinnati, Ohio, and graduated from Indiana University Bloomington with degrees in Business, French, and Japanese. He studied cooking at the École Supérieure de Cuisine Française (ESCF) - Ferrandi.  

He has three daughters and currently lives in New York City with his wife Mindy Dubin.

Professional career
He began his culinary career under the guidance of Shizuyo Shima in Tokyo, Japan.

Anthony moved to France in 1992 and attended cooking school at L’ecole Ferrandi, in Paris. Following that, he spent years training and working in several kitchens.  Anthony returned to the United States, working first in the kitchen of Restaurant Daniel and then as the Chef de Cuisine at March Restaurant.  Subsequently, he joined the team of Blue Hill as co-Chef of the Manhattan restaurant and later as the Executive Chef at Blue Hill Stone Barns.

In September 2006 Anthony took the position of Executive Chef at Gramercy Tavern. In 2011, he was named Chef-Partner of Gramercy Tavern.

In 2014, he was also named Executive Chef and Managing Director of Untitled and the Studio Cafe at the downtown Whitney Museum of American Art, overseeing operations, wine, food and beverage.

He is also the author of The Gramercy Tavern Cookbook, published by Clarkson Potter and "V is for Vegetable: Inspired Recipes & Techniques for Home Cooks- from Artichokes to Zucchini", published by Little, Brown and Company.

Social Activism
Anthony maintains strong relationships between the restaurant and local farmers.  He arranges visits to local farms for his staff so they can learn first-hand how and where the food they serve each day is grown.  He also invites local producers to Gramercy Tavern to share their knowledge with staff and guests through tastings and presentations.  The Main Dining Room and the Tavern menus highlight these relationships through Anthony’s cuisine.

Anthony is a board member of God’s Love We Deliver and is devoted to their mission of "food as medicine." Each year Gramercy Tavern participates in the Race to Deliver, leading the charge of fundraising efforts.

He is also a council member of City Harvest’s Food Council and a supporter of the Garden Program at PS 41.

Accolades
 "Best New Chefs" in Food & Wine magazine’s chef category in 2002
 Three Stars from The New York Times for "Blue Hill at Stone Barns"
 Three Stars from The New York Times for "Gramercy Tavern" 2007
 "Best New Chef" in Time Out New York’s New York City category in 2007 
 "Outstanding Restaurant" in 2008 from the James Beard Foundation for "Gramercy Tavern"
 "Best Chef New York City" from the James Beard Foundation in 2012 
 Gramercy Tavern, Michelin Guide, One Star
 "Outstanding Chef" from the James Beard Foundation in 2015
 "Best Vegetable-Focused Cookbook" from the James Beard Foundation in 2015 for V is for Vegetables.
 Three Stars from The New York Times for "Gramercy Tavern" 2016

Bibliography
 The Gramercy Tavern Cookbook (2012), 
 V is for Vegetables: Inspired Recipes & Techniques for Home Cooks—from Artichokes to Zucchini (2015, Little, Brown and Company),

References

External links
 
 

1968 births
Living people
Indiana University Bloomington alumni
American male chefs
Chefs from New York City
People from Cincinnati